The Second Epistle of Clement, often referred to as 2 Clement (pronounced "Second Clement"), is an early Christian writing. It was at one point possibly considered canonical by the Coptic Orthodox Church.

Authorship 
2 Clement was traditionally believed to have been an epistle to the Christian Church in Corinth written by Clement of Rome sometime in the late 1st century. However, 4th-century bishop Eusebius, in his historical work, says that there was only one recognized epistle of Clement (namely the so-called First Epistle of Clement). He expresses doubt about the authenticity of a second epistle. Similar doubts were also expressed by Jerome in the 5th century. Modern scholars believe that Second Clement is actually a sermon written around 95–140 CE by an anonymous author, one who was not Clement of Rome. Nonetheless, scholars still generally refer to the work by its traditional name "Second Clement", although it is sometimes also referred to as "An Ancient Christian Homily".

2 Clement appears to be a transcript of a homily or sermon that was originally delivered orally at a Christian worship service. For example, in chapter 19, the speaker announces that they will read aloud from scripture – something one would only expect to find in a transcript of an oral sermon. Similarly, whereas an epistle would typically begin by introducing the sender and recipient, 2 Clement starts with by addressing "Brethren", and then proceeding directly to the sermon.  If it is a sermon, 2 Clement would be the earliest surviving Christian sermon (aside from those found in the New Testament).

Like many early Christian texts, 2 Clement was written in Greek, the common language of the Hellenized Mediterranean area.

The earliest external reference to 2 Clement is found in Eusebius's Ecclesiastical History written in the early 4th century:

Content 

Rather than trying to convert others to Christianity, 2 Clement appears to be directed at an audience of Christians who had converted from Paganism. 2 Clement seems to reference a history of idolatry: "[Previously] we were maimed in our understanding – we were worshipping stones and pieces of wood, and gold and silver and copper – all of them made by humans".

Despite their pagan background, the speaker and audience in 2 Clement appear to consider the Jewish texts to be scripture – the speaker quotes repeatedly from the Book of Isaiah and interprets the text. The speaker also regards the words of Jesus as scripture – for example, 2 Clement 2:4 mentions a saying of Jesus (identical to Mark 2:17) as "scripture":

In addition to the canonical literature, the author of 2 Clement appears to have had access to Christian writings or oral tradition aside from those found in the New Testament. Some quotes attributed to Jesus are found only here, e.g. 4:5:

In 2 Clement 5:2-4, the author quotes a saying of Jesus which is partially found in the New Testament, but the version quoted in 2 Clement is substantially longer than the version found in the New Testament.

In the 20th century, a manuscript fragment was discovered that suggests this saying is a quote from the Gospel of Peter, much of which has been lost. Similarly, 2 Clement 12:2 says:

He then goes on to give interpretations of these metaphors. The saying was ascribed to Cassianus and to the Greek Gospel of the Egyptians by Clement of Alexandria.

A version of the saying is found in the Coptic Gospel of Thomas, which was lost until the mid-20th century:

See also
 Pseudo-Clementine literature

Notes

Sources

Further reading

External links 
An extensive list of English translations of 2 Clement
Chapters 1 to 10 in Greek
Chaapters 11 to 20 in Greek

(See also the Wikisource links to the right.)

Early Christian Writings – 2 Clement English translation (with some typos)

Clement
Apostolic Fathers
2nd-century Christian texts
Documents of Pope Clement I
Christian sermons